Miss Polski 2012 was the 23rd Miss Polski pageant, held on December 8, 2012. The winner was Katarzyna Krzeszowska of Lower Poland. In addition to receiving the title Krzeszowska also received a Chevrolet car. Krzeszowska represented Poland in Miss World 2013, Miss Supranational 2014 and Miss Grand International 2015. One of the top 10 semi-finalists, Anna Moniuszko to be specific, represented the country at Miss Grand International 2013.

Final results

Special Awards

Judges
 Lech Daniłowicz - President and Owner of Missland
 Angelika Ogryzek - Miss Polski 2011
 Robert Czepiel - CEO of Jubiler Schubert
 Katrin Hubers - Founder and Designer of the Le Blakk brand
 Weronika Szmajdzińska - Miss Global Teen 2012, Miss Polish Teenager 2011, Polish representative at Miss World 2012
 Jolanta Lewicka - Brafitting expert, Owner of Li Parie Salons
 Ekaterina Buraya - Miss Supranational 2012
 Michał Starost - Artistic Director and Chief Designer of the Ufufu brand
 Sławomir Stopczyk - Owner of the Stoper brand
 Przemysław Wasilewski - Director of the Kawallo hotel
 Edward Hajdrych - Development Director of Gosh Cosmetics
 Jerzy Olizarowski - Member of the board of the Lactalis group
 Gerhard Parzutka von Lipiński - President of the Miss Polski competition

Finalists

Notes

Withdrawals
 Holy Cross
 West Pomerania
 Polish Community in Australia
 Polish Community in Germany

Did not compete
 Lubusz
 Opole
 Subcarpathia
 Polish Community in Argentina
 Polish Community in Belarus
 Polish Community in Brazil
 Polish Community in Canada
 Polish Community in France
 Polish Community in Ireland
 Polish Community in Israel
 Polish Community in Lithuania
 Polish Community in Russia
 Polish Community in South Africa
 Polish Community in Sweden
 Polish Community in the U.K.
 Polish Community in the U.S.
 Polish Community in Venezuela

References

External links
Official Website

2012
2012 beauty pageants
2012 in Poland